Pseudostegania is a genus of moths in the family Geometridae. It is often treated as a synonym of Asthena.

Species
 Pseudostegania burmaensis D.Y. Xue & H.X. Han, 2010
 Pseudostegania defectata (Christoph, 1881)
 Pseudostegania distinctaria (Leech, 1897)
 Pseudostegania lijiangensis D.Y. Xue & Stüning, 2010
 Pseudostegania qinlingensis D.Y. Xue & H.X. Han, 2010
 Pseudostegania straminearia (Leech, 1897)
 Pseudostegania yargongaria (Oberthür, 1916)
 Pseudostegania zhoui D.Y. Xue & H.X. Han, 2010

References

 , 2010: Taxonomic review of the genus Pseudostegania Butler, 1881, with description of four new species and comments on its tribal placement in the Larentiinae (Lepidoptera: Geometridae). Entomological Science 13 (2): 234-249. 

Asthenini
Moth genera